Chennur or Chennuru may refer to:
Chennuru, Khammam district, a village in Khammam district, Telangana, India
Chennur, Kadapa district, a village in Kadapa district, Andhra Pradesh, India
Chennur, Mancherial district, a village in Mancherial district, Telangana, India
Chennur, Nellore district, a village in Nellore district, Andhra Pradesh, India
Chennur, Wanaparthy district, a village in Gopalpeta, Telangana
 Chennur (Assembly constituency), Telangana